HLA-B38 (B38) is an HLA-B serotype. The serotype identifies the B*38 allele products of the HLA-B gene-locus.

B38 is a split antigen of the broad antigen B16, and is a sister type of B39.  The B*3801 allele is more common in Eastern, Southern and Southeastern Europe, while the B*3802 allele is more common in the Far East.

Serotype

Alleles

Disease
A higher frequency of HLA-B38 was noted psoriatic arthritis patients with erythroderma. Psoriatic arthritis is linked to MICA and/or B39 in other peoples. In Pemphigus vulgaris a haplotype containing B38 was identified and found to be shared between Spanish and Jewish patients. Linkage studies indicate a factor in the HLA-class I region is more greatly associated, with HLA-B38 so far the only linked allele

References

3